Shepherdia argentea, commonly called silver buffaloberry, bull berry, or thorny buffaloberry, is a species of Shepherdia in the Oleaster family.

It is native to central and western North America, from the Prairie Provinces of Canada (Alberta, Saskatchewan, Manitoba) southwards in the United States as far as Ventura County in California, as well as northern Arizona, and northwestern New Mexico.

Description
The leaves are arranged in opposite pairs (rarely alternately arranged), 2–6 cm long, oval with a rounded apex, green with a covering of fine silvery, silky hairs, more thickly silvery below than above.

The flowers are pale yellow, with four sepals but no petals.

The fruit is a bright red fleshy drupe 5 mm in diameter; it is edible but with a rather bitter taste. Two cultivars, 'Xanthocarpa' and 'Goldeneye', form yellow fruit.

The Latin specific epithet argentea refers to the silver color of the plant's leaves and stems.

Distribution and habitat 
Shepherdia argentea is native to the western and central parts of Canada and North America. It grows in many different kinds of habitats such as riparian areas, woodlands, exposed slopes on prairies, and in dry, sandy soils of plains and canyons.

Ecology
The berry is one of the mainstays of the diet of the sharp-tailed grouse, the provincial bird of Saskatchewan. The foliage provides important forage for mule deer and white-tailed deer.   The shrub's thorny branches and thicket forming habit provide a shelter for many small animal species and an ideal nesting site for songbirds. Over the extent of its range, the buffaloberry is an important species in a variety of ecological communities. For example, in the shrub-grassland communities of North Dakota it is found growing with many native grasses, while in riparian woodlands of Montana and Western North Dakota it can be found in plant communities dominated by green ash.

Uses
Like the Canada buffaloberry, Sheperdia argentea has been used historically as a food, medicine, and dye. Its various uses including the treatment of stomach troubles and in coming-of-age ceremonies for girls.

In the Great Basin, the berries were eaten raw and dried for winter use, but more often cooked into a flavoring sauce for bison meat.  The buffaloberry has been a staple food to some American Indians, who ate the berries in puddings, jellies, and in raw or dried form.

The Gosiute Shoshone name for the plant is añ-ka-mo-do-nûp.

References

External links

 
Jepson Manual Treatment for Shepherdia argentea
University of Michigan—Dearborn: Native American Ethnobotany of Silver buffaloberry 
United States Department of Agriculture, National Forest Service Fire Ecology
Shepherdia argentea — Calphotos Photo gallery, University of California

argentea
Berries
Plants described in 1813
Natural history of the California Coast Ranges
Natural history of the Transverse Ranges
Medicinal plants of North America
Plants used in traditional Native American medicine
Flora of the Northwestern United States
Flora of the Southwestern United States
Flora of the North-Central United States
Flora of the South-Central United States
Flora of Western Canada
Flora without expected TNC conservation status